Paulo Roberto de Araújo Prestes  or simply Paulo Roberto (born 21 April 1964), is a Brazilian retired footballer who played as a left back.

References

1964 births
Living people
Footballers from Porto Alegre
Brazilian footballers
Campeonato Brasileiro Série A players
Sport Club Internacional players
Botafogo de Futebol e Regatas players
Sociedade Esportiva Palmeiras players
Clube Atlético Mineiro players
Association football defenders